Ḥamza ibn ʿAbd al-Muṭṭalib was a foster brother, paternal uncle, maternal second-cousin, and companion of the Islamic prophet Muhammad.

He was martyred in the Battle of Uhud on 23 March 625 (7 Shawwal 3 hijri). His kunyas were "Abū ʿUmāra" and "Abū Yaʿlā". He had the by-names Asad Allāh ("Lion of God") and  "Asad of his Messenger ,  and Muhammad gave him the posthumous title Sayyid al-Shuhadāʾ.

Early life

Ibn Sa'd basing his claim on al-Waqidi states that Hamza was reportedly four years older than Muhammad. This is disputed by Ibn Sayyid, who argues: "Zubayr narrated that Hamza was four years older than the Prophet. But this does not seem correct, because reliable hadith state that Thuwayba nursed both Hamza and the Prophet." Ibn Sayyid concludes that Hamza was only two years older than Muhammad۔ Ibn Hajar writes as a conclusion of Ibn Sayyid's hadiths: "Hamza was born two to four years before Muhammad". 

Ibn Kathir in Al-Sira Al-Nabawiyya cites Abu Nu`aym who traces a hadith to Ibn Abbas, that after Abdul Mutallib went to Yemen, he stayed with a Jewish priest. A monk prophesied that he will have both power and prophethood and advised him to marry a woman of the Banu Zuhra. After returning to Mecca, he did so by marrying Hala, a woman of the tribe, and she birthed Hamza. Later, Abdullah married Amina and the Quraysh said he had won out in terms of marriage.

Hamza was skilled in wrestling, archery and fighting. He was fond of hunting lions, and he is described as "the strongest man of the Quraysh, and the most unyielding".

Family

Parents
Hamza's father was Abd al-Muttalib ibn Hashim ibn Abd Manaf ibn Qusayy from the Qurayshi tribe of Mecca. His mother was Hala bint Wuhayb from the Zuhra clan of Quraysh. Tabari cites two different traditions. In one, Al-Waqidi states that his parents met when Abd al-Muttalib went with his son Abdullah to the house of Wahb ibn Abd Manaf to seek the hand of Wahb's daughter Amina. While they were there, Abd al-Muttalib noticed Wahb's niece, Hala bint Wuhayb, and he asked for her hand as well. Wahb agreed, and Muhammad's father Abdullah and his grandfather Abd al-Muttalib were both married on the same day, in a double-marriage ceremony. Hence, Hamza was the younger brother of Muhammad's father.

Marriages and children
Hamza married three times and had six children.
 Salma bint Umays ibn Ma'd, the half-sister of Maymuna bint al-Harith.
Umama bint Hamza, wife of Salama ibn Abi Salama.
 Zaynab bint Al-Milla ibn Malik of the Aws tribe in Medina.
 Amir ibn Hamza. 
Bakr ibn Hamza, who died in childhood.
 Khawla bint Qays ibn Amir of the An-Najjar clan. He had issue, but their descendants had died out by the time of Ibn Sa'd.
 Umar ibn Hamza.
Atika bint Hamza.
Barra bint Hamza.

Conversion to Islam
Hamza took little notice of Islam for the first few years.
He converted in late 616 AD. Upon returning to Mecca after a hunting trip in the desert, he heard that Amr ibn Hishām (referred in Islamic scriptures as "Abu Jahl" Father of Ignorance) had "attacked the Prophet and abused and insulted him," "speaking spitefully of his religion and trying to bring him into disrepute". Muhammad had not replied to him. "Filled with rage," Hamza "went out at a run ... meaning to punish Abu Hishām when he met him". He entered the Kaaba, where Abu Hishām was sitting with the elders, stood over him and "struck him a violent blow" with his bow. He said, "Will you insult him, when I am of his religion and say what he says? Hit me back if you can!" He "struck Abu Jahl's head with a blow that cut open his head". Some of Abu Hishām's relatives approached to help him, but he told them, "Leave Abu Umara [Hamza] alone, for, by God, I insulted his nephew deeply".

After that incident, Hamza entered the House of Al-Arqam and declared Islam. "Hamza’s Islam was complete, and he followed the Apostle's commands. When he became a Muslim, the Quraysh recognised that the Apostle had become strong, and had found a protector in Hamza, and so they abandoned some of their ways of harassing him". Instead, they tried to strike bargains with him; but he did not accept their offers.

Hamza once asked Muhammad to show him the angel Jibreel in his true form. Muhammad told Hamza that he would not be able to see him. Hamza retorted that he would see the angel, so Muhammad told him to sit where he was. They claimed that Jibreel descended before them and that Hamza saw that Jibreel's feet were like emeralds, before falling down unconscious.

Hamza joined the emigration to Medina in 622 and lodged with Kulthum ibn al-Hidm or Saad ibn Khaythama. Muhammad made him the brother in Islam of Zayd ibn Haritha.

Military expeditions

First expedition

Muhammad sent Hamza on his first raid against Quraysh. Hamza led an expedition of thirty riders to the coast in Juhayna territory to intercept a merchant-caravan returning from Syria. Hamza met Abu Hishām at the head of the caravan with three hundred riders at the seashore. Majdi ibn Amr al-Juhani intervened between them, "for he was at peace with both parties," and the two parties separated without any fighting.

There is dispute as to whether Hamza or his nephew Ubayda ibn al-Harith was the first Muslim to whom Muhammad gave a flag.

Battle of Badr

Hamza fought at the Battle of Badr, where he shared a camel with Zayd ibn Haritha and where his distinctive ostrich feather made him highly visible. The Muslims blocked the wells at Badr.
Al-Aaswad ibn Abdalasad al-Makhzumi, who was a quarrelsome ill-natured man, stepped forth and said, "I swear to God that I will drink from their cistern or destroy it or die before reaching it". Hamza came forth against him, and when the two met, Hamza smote him and sent his foot and half his shank flying as he was near the cistern. He fell on his back and lay there, blood streaming from his foot towards his comrades. Then he crawled to the cistern and threw himself into it with the purpose of fulfilling his oath, but Hamza followed him and smote him and killed him in the cistern".
He then killed Utba ibn Rabi'a in single combat and helped Ali to kill Utba's brother Shayba. It is disputed whether it was Hamza or Ali who killed Tuwayma ibn Adiy.

Later Hamza carried Muhammad's banner in the expedition against the Banu Qaynuqa.

Death

Hamza was martyred in the Battle of Uhud on Saturday 23 March 625 (7 Shawwal 3 hijri) when he was 57-59 years old. He was standing in front of Muhammad, fighting with two swords and then Abyssinian slave Wahshi ibn Harb with a promise of manumission from Hind bint Utba, if he killed Hamza. This was to revenge her father, Utba ibn Rabi'a, whom Hamza had killed in Badr. Hamza, running back and forth, stumbled and fell on his back; and Wahshi said, "who could throw a javelin as the Abyssinians do and seldom missed the mark," threw it into Hamza's abdomen and martyred him.

Wahshi then slit open his stomach and brought his liver to Hind bint Utba, whose father Hamza had killed at Badr (see above). Hind chewed Hamza's liver then spat it out. "Then she went and mutilated Hamza and made anklets, necklaces and pendants from his body, and brought him and his liver to Mecca".

Hamza was buried in the same grave as his nephew Abdullah ibn Jahsh. Muhammad later said, "I saw the angels washing Hamza because he was in Paradise on that day". Fatima used to go to Hamza's grave and tend it.

Family tree

 * indicates that the marriage order is disputed
 Note that direct lineage is marked in bold.

See also
Hamzanama
List of expeditions of Muhammad
Sunni view of the Sahaba
The Message (1976 film)
Ali ibn Abi Talib
Badr al-Jamali
Malik al-Ashtar
Al Qaid Johar
Habib bin Mazahir
Abbas ibn Ali

References

Family of Muhammad
Medieval Arabs killed in battle
Arab Muslims
Sahabah martyrs
Angelic visionaries
570s births
625 deaths
6th-century Arabs
Sahabah who participated in the battle of Uhud
Sahabah who participated in the battle of Badr
Banu Hashim